Mandalay Central Prison, informally known as Obo Prison, is a major prison located in Aungmyethazan Township, Mandalay, Myanmar (formerly Burma). The prison is adjacent to the Obo railway station, and located northeast of the city centre, at the foot of Mandalay Hill. The prison has a capacity of 4,833 inmates. Mandalay Central Prison has housed many prominent political prisoners, including Zaw Myint Maung, Ye Lwin, and Win Htein.

History 
The prison was built in 1992 by the State Law and Order Restoration Council, the ruling military junta, to replace a pre-colonial jail inside Mandalay Palace, amid domestic unrest following the 8888 Uprising. The prison's half-spoke wheel design has been used as a reference model for subsequent prison designs in the country.

In April 2008, 5 inmates at the prison were charged with murder after Kyaw Myo Thu, an inmate was found dead in a jail cell. In the aftermath of the 2021 Myanmar coup d'etat, Obo Prison has been used to house numerous political prisoners. In August 2022, several prisoners were shot for staging a hunger strike, in response to the high-profile execution of anti-coup political activists, including Kyaw Min Yu and Phyo Zeyar Thaw.

Notable prisoners
Zaw Myint Maung
Ye Lwin
Win Htein

References 

Mandalay Region
Prisons in Myanmar
Buildings and structures in Mandalay
1992 establishments in Myanmar